The 472d Tactical Electronic Warfare Squadron is an inactive United States Air Force unit.  It was active during World War II as the 472d Bombardment Squadron, a component of the 334th Bombardment Group at Greenville Army Air Base, South Carolina, where it was disbanded in 1944.

The 472d Fighter-Bomber Squadron was active in the Air Force Reserve at Selfridge Air Force Base and Willow Run Airport, where it was inactivated in 1957.

In 1985, the United States Air Force consolidated the two squadrons.  However, the unit has not been active since consolidation.

History

World War II
The 472d Bombardment Squadron was activated in the summer of 1942 as one of the four original squadrons of the 334th Bombardment Group at Greenville AAB, South Carolina.  It operated as a North American B-25 Mitchell replacement training unit.  Replacement training units weroversized units which trained aircrews prior to their deployment to combat theaters.  However, the Army Air Forces found that standard military units, based on relatively inflexible tables of organization were proving less well adapted to the training mission.  Accordingly, a more functional system was adopted in which each base was organized into a separate numbered unit.  This resulted in the 471st, along with other units at Greenville, being disbanded in the spring of 1944 and being replaced by the 330th AAF Base Unit (Replacement Training Unit, Medium, Bombardment).

Reserve Cold War Operations
The 472d Fighter-Bomber Squadron was activated in 1954, in the 439th Fighter-Bomber Group when it replaced the 92d Troop Carrier Squadron in the Air Force Reserve.  Continental Air Command was unable to rename the 92d as a fighter-bomber unit because the 92d Fighter-Bomber Squadron was an active USAF unit.  The squadron was originally equipped with Lockheed F-80 Shooting Stars, but re-equipped with Republic F-84 Thunderjets in 1956.  It also operated a variety of trainer and transport aircraft.  The 472d was inactivated in late 1957 when reserve flying operations at Willow Run Airport terminated.

The two squadrons were consolidated in 1985, as the 472d Tactical Electronic Warfare Squadron, but have never been active since consolidation,

Lineage

472d Bombardment Squadron
 Constituted as the 472d Bombardment Squadron (Medium) on 9 July 1942
 Activated on 16 July 1942
 Disbanded on 1 May 1944
 Reconstituted on 19 September 1985 and consolidated with the 472d Fighter-Bomber Squadron as the 472d Tactical Electronic Warfare Squadron

472d Fighter-Bomber Squadron
 Constituted as the 472d Fighter-Bomber Squadron
 Activated on 1 April 1954
 Inactivated on 16 November 1957
 Consolidated with the 472d Bombardment Squadron on 19 September 1985 as the 472d Tactical Electronic Warfare Squadron

Assignments
 334th Bombardment Group, 16 July 1942 – 1 May 1944
 439th Fighter-Bomber Group, 1 April 1954 - 16 November 1957

Stations
 Greenville Army Air Base, South Carolina, 16 July 1942 – 1 May 1944
 Selfridge Air Force Base, Michigan, 1 April 1954
 Willow Run Airport, Michigan, ca. 18 December 1955 – 16 November 1957

Aircraft

 B-25 Mitchell, 1942–1944
 Lockheed F-80 Shooting Star, 1954-1956
 Republic F-84 Thunderjet, 1956-1957
 Also equipped with trainer and transport aircraft 1954-1957

Service Streamer

Notes 
 Explanatory notes

 Citations

References 

 
 Martin, Patrick. Tail Code: The Complete History of USAF Tactical Aircraft Tail Code Markings. Schiffer Publishing, 1994. .
 
 

Fighter squadrons of the United States Air Force
Military units and formations disestablished in 1957